Ngātata-i-te-rangi  (? – 1854) was a New Zealand Te Āti Awa leader, and belonged to the Ngāi Te Whiti hapū.

Ngātata-i-te-rangi was the son of Te Rangiwhetiki and brother of Te Marokura. He married Whetowheto and had five children, one being Wi Tako Ngātata. Later in life he had a second wife and they had a daughter named Meri Haratua.

Ngātata-i-te-rangi established Kumutoto Pā alongside Wi Piti Pomare.

Ngātata-i-te-rangi signed the Treaty of Waitangi in Wellington on 29 April 1840.

References

1854 deaths
Te Āti Awa people
Signatories of the Treaty of Waitangi
People from Taranaki
Year of birth unknown